Thomas Lavern Alward (born October 13, 1952, in Flint, Michigan) was a National Football League offensive guard who played in 1976 for the Tampa Bay Buccaneers. He attended high school at Bendle High School, college at the University of Nebraska and was the New York Jets 6th round pick in the 1975 NFL Draft.

He is currently head football coach at Goodrich High School in Goodrich, Michigan.

References

Living people
1952 births
Tampa Bay Buccaneers players
American football offensive guards
Nebraska Cornhuskers football players